Águas Mornas is a Brazilian municipality in the state of Santa Catarina.

The municipality contains part of the Rio das Lontras Private Natural Heritage Reserve, a fully protected area of montane rainforest in the Atlantic Forest biome.
It also contains part of the  Serra do Tabuleiro State Park, a protected area created in 1975.
The lushly-forested park protects the sources of the Vargem do Braço, Cubatão and D'Una rivers, which supply most of the drinking water for greater Florianópolis and the south coast region.

References

Municipalities in Santa Catarina (state)